Oluseyi Oyelade is an Anglican bishop in Nigeria: he is the current Bishop of Ife East.

Oyelade was elected on April 16, 2010, having previously been an archdeacon and the incumbent at  Our Saviours Church Garki, Abuja.

Notes

Living people
Anglican bishops of Ife East
21st-century Anglican bishops in Nigeria
Year of birth missing (living people)
Church of Nigeria archdeacons